ROKS Gangwon is the name of three Republic of Korea Navy warships:

Republic of Korea Navy ship names